NGC 209 is a lenticular galaxy located approximately 175 million light-years from the Solar System in the constellation Cetus. It was discovered on October 9, 1885 by Francis Leavenworth.

See also 
 List of NGC objects (1–1000)

References

External links 
  
 SEDS

0209
2338
Astronomical objects discovered in 1885
Galaxies discovered in 1885
Cetus (constellation)
Unbarred lenticular galaxies